The Chronicles of Federman is a 41-track three-volume comedy album spanning the career of comedian Wayne Federman released in 2016 on ASpecialThing Records. It was recorded over 31 years at various venues throughout the USA.

Track listing
All tracks written by Wayne Federman.

Disc 1
Intro/84 Olympics/Disney/Rambo
Origami/Physicals/Football
NY Beaches/Back Rubs/Crush
Bad Haircut/Religious/AMC Gremlin
Newlywed/Air Florida/Gefilte Fish
Folk Singers/Steve Miller/Janis
Acoustic/Electric Ukulele
NY Apartment/Dodgeball/Musical Chairs
Baseball Metaphor
Skiing
Slurpee/Jamaicans/Uke History
Ventriloquism

Disc 2
Intro/Web Site
Extra Work/Days of Thunder
Guitar Players/Epilady/Mascots
Kiss
Working Out/Colleges/Video Rental
Taco Bell/Hot Dogs
Turning Left/Carpool Lane
Oily Skin/Acting Coach/Birthdays/The Bedroom
Picked for Sports/Towel Snapping
Pink Floyd
Underdog/World Book/Surgeon General
Jimmy Page/Streisand/Robert Johnson
My Bicycle/West Hollywood/Alanis Morissette
Rockin With Dokken
Mcdonald's/Television Set
David Stern Podcast

Disc 3
Intro/Mission Statement
Book of Questions/Plantation/Elton/Dr./iPhone
Carson/99 Cent/Piano/Wayne/Dave Matthews/Enya
Without Borders/Beethoven/Nba
Hanukkah/Wikipedia/Parents Driving/PBS Jazz
My Dream/Memoir/Forever Stamps/Snapped
Chuck E. Cheese/La River/Team Names
Mobil Mart/Sylvia Plath/Piano 2
Largo X-Mas/Carpenters/My Song/Jesus Christ/Abortion
Gravity/Woody Allen
Medicine/Piano 3/Marathon/NYU
Israel
Outro

References

Wayne Federman albums
2016 albums
2010s comedy albums
Stand-up comedy albums